Edward Quin may refer to:
 Edward Quin (journalist)
 Edward Quin (pastoralist)

See also
 Edward Quinn, Irish photographer
 Edward W. Quinn, mayor of Cambridge, Massachusetts